Geoffroy le Rat (died 1207) was the thirteenth Grand Master of the Knights Hospitaller, serving between 1206–1207.  He succeeded the Grand Master Fernando Afonso after his resignation in 1206, and was succeeded by Guérin de Montaigu.

Biography
Geoffroy le Rat did not occupy the position of Grand Master until mid–1206 and the beginning of the second half of 1207. He was of French origin, attached to a family of Touraine.

He had been a commander in the Principality of Antioch and lord of the Krak des Chevaliers before being elected as master.

As the Fourth Crusade was diverted to Constantinople, the Hospitallers did not have a military role at the beginning of the thirteenth century.

See also

 Cartulaire général de l'Ordre des Hospitaliers
 List of Knights Hospitaller sites
 Langue (Knights Hospitaller)
 Flags of the Knights Hospitaller

References

Bibliography

External links
Geoffroy le Rat. French Wikipedia.
Liste des grands maîtres de l'ordre de Saint-Jean de Jérusalem. French Wikipedia.
Eugène Harot, Essai d’armorial des Grands-Maîtres de l’Ordre de Saint Jean de Jérusalem.
Seals of the Grand Masters. Museum of the Order of St John.
Charles Moeller, Hospitallers of St. John of Jerusalem. Catholic Encyclopedia (1910). 7. New York: Robert Appleton Company.
	

1207 deaths
12th-century French people
13th-century French people
Knights Hospitaller
Grand Masters of the Knights Hospitaller